Cosmoclopius is a genus of South American assassin bugs (insects in the family Reduviidae), in the subfamily Harpactorinae.

7 species have been described.

Partial list of species
Cosmoclopius curacavensis Cobben and Wygodzinsky 1975
Cosmoclopius nigroannulatus Stal

References

Reduviidae
Cimicomorpha genera
Hemiptera of South America